Soft landing may refer to:

Soft landing (aeronautics), any landing which does not result in the destruction of the payload and/or the vehicle
Soft landing (economics), a business cycle downturn which avoids recession